Arditta is an unincorporated community in southwest Howell County, in the Ozarks of southern Missouri. Arditta is located on U.S. Route 160 between Egypt Grove and Caulfield. It is approximately twelve miles southwest of West Plains.

History
A post office called Arditta was established in 1904, and remained in operation until 1934. The origin of the name "Arditta" is unknown.

In 1925, Arditta had 14 inhabitants.

References

Unincorporated communities in Howell County, Missouri
Unincorporated communities in Missouri